The Gell-Mann matrices, developed by Murray Gell-Mann, are a set of eight linearly independent 3×3 traceless Hermitian matrices  used in the study of the strong interaction in particle physics.
They span the  Lie algebra of the SU(3) group in the defining representation.

Matrices

{| border="0" cellpadding="8" cellspacing="0"
| 
| 
| 
|-
| 
| 
|
|-
| 
| 
|
|}

Properties

These matrices are traceless, Hermitian, and obey the extra trace orthonormality relation (so they can generate unitary matrix group elements of SU(3) through exponentiation). These properties were chosen by Gell-Mann because they then naturally generalize the Pauli matrices for SU(2) to SU(3), which formed the basis for Gell-Mann's quark model. Gell-Mann's generalization further extends to general SU(n). For their connection to the standard basis of Lie algebras, see  the Weyl–Cartan basis.

Trace orthonormality

In mathematics, orthonormality typically implies a norm which has a value of unity (1).  Gell-Mann matrices, however, are normalized to a value of 2.  Thus, the trace of the pairwise product results in the ortho-normalization condition

where  is the Kronecker delta.

This is so the embedded Pauli matrices corresponding to the  three embedded subalgebras of SU(2) are conventionally normalized.

There are three independent SU(2) subalgebras:

 and

The  SU(2) Casimirs of these subalgebras mutually commute.

However, any unitary similarity transformation of these subalgebras will yield SU(2) subalgebras. There is an uncountable number of such transformations.

Commutation relations

The 8 generators of SU(3) satisfy the commutation and anti-commutation relations

 

with the structure constants

 

For the present order of Gell-Mann matrices they take the values

In general, they evaluate to zero, unless they contain an odd count of indices from the set {2,5,7}, corresponding to the antisymmetric (imaginary) s.

Using these commutation relations, the product of Gell-Mann matrices can be written as

 

where  is the identity matrix.

Fierz completeness relations

Since the eight matrices and the identity are a complete trace-orthogonal set spanning all 3×3 matrices, it is straightforward to find two Fierz completeness relations, (Li & Cheng, 4.134), analogous to that satisfied by the Pauli matrices. Namely, using the dot to sum over the eight matrices and using Greek indices for their row/column indices, the following identities hold,

and 

One may prefer the recast version, resulting from a linear combination of the above,

Representation theory

A particular choice of matrices is called a group representation, because any element of SU(3) can be written in the form , where the eight  are real numbers and a sum over the index  is implied. Given one representation, an equivalent one may be obtained by an arbitrary unitary similarity transformation, since that leaves the commutator unchanged.

The matrices can be realized as a representation of the  infinitesimal generators of the special unitary group called SU(3).

Casimir operators and invariants

The squared sum of the Gell-Mann matrices gives the quadratic Casimir operator, a group invariant, 

where is 3×3 identity matrix. There is another, independent, cubic Casimir operator, as well.

Application to quantum chromodynamics

 
These matrices serve to study the internal (color) rotations of the gluon fields associated with the coloured quarks of quantum chromodynamics (cf. colours of the gluon). A gauge colour rotation is a spacetime-dependent SU(3) group element 
, where summation over the eight indices  is implied.

See also
 Casimir element
 Clebsch–Gordan coefficients for SU(3)
 Generalizations of Pauli matrices
 Group representations
 Killing form
 Pauli matrices
 Qutrit
 SU(3)

References

 

 
 
 

Matrices
Quantum chromodynamics
Mathematical physics
Theoretical physics
Lie algebras
Representation theory of Lie algebras